Mumbai Meri Jaan (translation: Mumbai, My Life) is a 2008 Indian drama film directed by Nishikant Kamat and produced by Ronnie Screwvala. It stars R. Madhavan, Irrfan Khan, Soha Ali Khan, Paresh Rawal and Kay Kay Menon. It deals with the aftermath of the 11 July 2006 Mumbai train bombings, where 209 people lost their lives and over 700 were injured. It won multiple Filmfare Awards.

Plot
Rupali Joshi (Soha Ali Khan) is a successful reporter who is getting married in two months. 
Nikhil Agrawal (Madhavan) is an environmentally conscious executive who rides the train to work every day and is expecting his first child. Suresh (Kay Kay Menon) is a struggling computer tech who spends his time loafing at a local cafe and criticizing Muslims. Meanwhile, Sunil Kadam (Vijay Maurya) struggles with the corruption and inefficiency of the Mumbai police force and his boss, Tukaram Patil (Paresh Rawal), who is nearing retirement.

On 11 July Nikhil and Suresh are in the second class compartment of a train when a bomb goes off in the first class compartment. The two survive, but Nikhil is too afraid to take the train again and is diagnosed with acute stress disorder. Suresh becomes obsessed with punishing the city's Muslims and is only stopped from antagonising them by Kadam and Patil on patrol. Kadam and Patil abuse a street vendor named Thomas (Irrfan Khan) who begins calling in fake bomb scares at malls to relieve his feelings. After an elderly man suffers a heart attack while the police are evacuating one mall, Thomas feels guilty and decides to stop.

Rupali, who rushed to the scene of the bombings to cover the story, is devastated when she discovers that her fiancé died in the blasts. Her grief is augmented when the news channel she works for tries to exploit her story for ratings. Meanwhile, Suresh pursues a Muslim that he suspects of being a terrorist. However, after Patil stops him and lectures him on communal harmony, Suresh befriends the man.

After Nikhil's wife goes into labour, he is forced to take the train to get to the hospital. Mumbai stops for two minutes while the city observes a moment of silence for those killed in the bombings. Patil finally retires from the police force and Kadam forgives him for his corrupt actions. Nikhil overcomes his fear of trains and Thomas gives a rose to the elderly man whose heart attack he caused.

Cast

R. Madhavan as Nikhil Agarwal
Irrfan Khan as Thomas
Soha Ali Khan as Rupali Joshi
Paresh Rawal as Tukaram Patil
Kay Kay Menon as Suresh
Anand Goradia as Ashish
Rio Kapadia as Rensil
Ayesha Raza Mishra as Sejal Agarwal
Vijay Maurya as Sunil Kadam
Vibhavari Deshpande as Archana Kadam
Kamlesh Sawant as Police Station In-Charge
Sachin Pathak as Guddu
Santosh Juvekar as Ashok
Kavin Dave as Zandu
Rajesh Bhosle as Manya
Saksham Dayama as Yusuf
Sameer Dharmadhikari as Ajay Pradhan
Sunil Kadam as Vijay Maurya
Vineet Sharma as Reporter
Harry Shah as Bakul Patel
Sameer Bapat as Sameer
Smita Jaykar as Sejal's mother
Kamlesh Sawant as Police Station-in-charge
Shri Vallabh Vyas as Drug addict girl's father
Prinal Oberoi as Anusha
Upendra Sidhaye as Mall receptionist
Nishikant Kamat as Vinod
Narayani Shastri as Shweta

Awards
Filmfare Critics Award for Best Movie - Winner 
Filmfare Best Screenplay Award - Winner 
Filmfare Best Editing Award - Winner
National Film Award for Best Special Effects for Govardhan (Tata Elxsi) - Winner
Best Feature Film at the New Generation Cinema Lyon Film Festival - Winner 
Best Screenplay award at the 2009 Asia Pacific Screen Awards - Nomination

Music
The end titles are accompanied by the song "Aye Dil Hain Mushkil" (also known as "Bombay Meri Jaan") from the 1956 film C.I.D., performed by Mohammed Rafi and Geeta Dutt.

See also
11 July 2006 Mumbai train bombings — the attacks on which the movie is based.
Terrorism in Mumbai
Aamir (film)
A Wednesday
Black Friday (2004 film)

References

External links
Official website

2008 films
2000s Hindi-language films
2000s Urdu-language films
Films set in Mumbai
Films about organised crime in India
Films about the mass media in India
Terrorist incidents in Mumbai
UTV Motion Pictures films
Fictional portrayals of the Maharashtra Police
Films that won the Best Special Effects National Film Award
Hyperlink films
Films directed by Nishikant Kamat
Urdu-language Indian films